Phillip Jabulani "Jabu" Moleketi (born 15 June 1957, in Pimville) was Deputy Minister of Finance in the Cabinet of South Africa of President Thabo Mbeki, from 2004 to 2008.

Following the resignation of President Mbeki, Moleketi was among those members of the Cabinet who submitted their resignations on 23 September 2008, although it was subsequently announced that, like Minister of Finance Trevor Manuel, he might be willing to remain in his post. In November 2008 President Kgalema Motlanthe appointed Nhlanhla Nene in his position.

He is married to Geraldine Fraser-Moleketi, the former Minister for the Public Service and Administration who was replaced by Richard Baloyi on 25 September 2008.

References

1957 births
Living people
Government ministers of South Africa